Elachista zophosema is a moth of the family Elachistidae that is found in Australia, where it has been recorded from higher altitudes in Tasmania.

The wingspan is 7.2–8 mm for males and about 6.8 mm for females. The ground colour of the forewings is pale ochreous, powdered with pale brownish grey-tipped scales. The hindwings are pale grey.

References

zophosema
Moths described in 1947
Endemic fauna of Australia
Moths of Australia